Lycée Albert Camus may refer to:

 Lycée français Albert Camus, a French secondary school in Conakry, Guinea
 Lycée Albert Camus (Bois-Colombes), a French senior high school in Bois-Colombes, Hauts-de-Seine, France
 , a French high school in Nantes, France